Arun Banner (Mongolian:   Arun qosiɣu, Mongolian Cyrillic: Арун хошуу) is a banner of northeastern Inner Mongolia, People's Republic of China, bordering Heilongjiang province to the south and east.

Climate

References

www.xzqh.org 

Banners of Inner Mongolia
Hulunbuir